Following World War II, the United States Department of Defense (and in some cases after 1977, the Department of Energy) funded basic scientific research at labs affiliated with a number of colleges and universities.  Here is an incomplete list:

Notes

References

.
.
Laboratories, defense research